Charles Green may refer to:

Arts and entertainment
 Charles Green (painter) (1840–1898), English painter and illustrator
 Charles Green Shaw (1892–1974), American abstract artist and writer
 Charlie Green (musician) (1893–1935), American jazz trombonist
 Chuck Green (1919–1997), American tap dancer
 Angry Grandpa or Charles Marvin Green Jr. (1950–2017), American YouTube personality
 Charlie Green (singer) (born 1997), child singer

Military
 Sir Charles Green, 1st Baronet (1749–1831), British Army general
 Charles D. B. Green (1897–1941), World War I flying ace
 Charles Green (Australian soldier) (1919–1950)
 Charles B. Green (born 1955), Surgeon General of the United States Air Force

Sports
 Charles Green (cricketer) (1846–1916), English cricketer
 Charlie Phil Rosenberg or Charles Green (1902–1976), American boxer, world champion bantamweight
 Charles Green (bobsleigh) (1914–1999), British Olympic bobsledder
 Charles Green (athlete) (1921–2009), Australian Olympian
 Charlie Green (American football) (born 1943), Oakland Raiders quarterback in 1966
 Joe Green (baseball, born 1878) (Charles Albert Green, 1878–1962), American baseball player

Other
 Charles Green (archaeologist) (1901–1972), English archaeologist
 Charles Green (astronomer) (1734–1771), British astronomer, travelled with James Cook
 Charles Green (balloonist) (1785–1870), England's most famous balloonist of the 19th century
 Charles Green (bishop) (1864–1944), Archbishop of Wales
 Charles Green (businessman) (born 1953), British businessman with Rangers F.C. and Sheffield United F.C.
 Charles Green (cook) (1888–1974), British ship's cook on Shackleton's Endurance expedition
 Charles C. Green, Republican politician in the U. S. State of Arizona
 Charles C. Green (1873–1940), Republican politician in the U. S. State of Ohio
 Charles Dymoke Green Sr. (1873–1954), British Scouting leader
 Charles Dymoke Green Jr. (1907–1988), British Scouting leader
 Charles Samuel Green State legislator in South Carolina
 Charles W. Green (1849–1926), first teacher of agriculture at Tuskegee Institute

See also
 Charles Greene (disambiguation)
 Charles Fiddian-Green (1898–1976), English cricketer
 Charles Leedham-Green, Scottish group theorist